El Calavera is a 1954 Argentinian film.

Directed by Carlos F. Borcosque, script by Emilio Villalba Welsh and Wilfredo Jimenez, based on Maurice Hennequin's and Pierre Veber's theater play Las delicias del hogar (Les Joies du foyer).  The movie was released on August 31, 1954.

Cast

Enrique Serrano
Elena Lucena
Jorge Rivier
Norma Giménez
Raimundo Pastore
Julián Bourges
Antonio Provitilo
Ángeles Martínez
Celia Geraldy
Rafael Diserio
Haydée Menta
Narciso Ibáñez Menta

References

External links
 

1954 films
1950s Spanish-language films
Argentine black-and-white films
Argentine films based on plays
Argentine comedy films
1954 comedy films
1950s Argentine films